Muhammad Irfan Sr. (born 1 April 1990) is a Pakistani field hockey player who plays as a defender for the Pakistan national team. He was a member of Pakistani team in the 2010 Commonwealth Games in New Delhi, India.  In 2010 Irfan was suspended for three games for deliberately pushing a South African player. He has played in the 2010 World Cup and was selected for the 2018 World Cup.  He also represented Pakistan at the 2012 Summer Olympics.  He also played for Pakistan in the 2011 and 2014 Champions Trophy events.

References

External links
FIH profile

1990 births
Living people
Pakistani male field hockey players
Olympic field hockey players of Pakistan
male field hockey defenders
People from Toba Tek Singh District
Field hockey players at the 2010 Commonwealth Games
Field hockey players at the 2010 Asian Games
2010 Men's Hockey World Cup players
Field hockey players at the 2012 Summer Olympics
Field hockey players at the 2014 Asian Games
2018 Men's Hockey World Cup players
Field hockey players at the 2018 Asian Games
Asian Games gold medalists for Pakistan
Asian Games silver medalists for Pakistan
Medalists at the 2010 Asian Games
Medalists at the 2014 Asian Games
Asian Games medalists in field hockey
Commonwealth Games competitors for Pakistan
21st-century Pakistani people